A list of science fiction films released in the 1940s. These 45 films include core elements of science fiction and are widely distributed with reviews by reputable
critics.

List

See also
 History of science fiction films
 List of film serials

References

 
Lists of 1940s films by genre
1940s